Hampton Island is part of the Great Barrier Reef Marine Park and the southernmost island in the Cole Islands group and National Park and is about 100 km south-east of Cape Melville, Queensland. It is around 28 hectares or 0.28 square km in size.

References

External links
Hampton Island Preserve

Islands on the Great Barrier Reef
Uninhabited islands of Australia
Islands of Far North Queensland
Places in the Great Barrier Reef Marine Park